Alvin "Al" Burleson (born September 25, 1954) is a former American gridiron football player.  He played professionally in the Canadian Football League (CFL) for the Calgary Stampeders, from 1976 to 1981, and in the United States Football League (USFL) for the Los Angeles Express, in 1983. Burleson is the father of four sons, including National Football League (NFL) wide receiver Nate Burleson and National Basketball Association (NBA) guard Kevin Burleson.

College career
Burleson played at the University of Washington, where he lettered from 1973 to 1975, finishing as a captain of the 1975 team.

He was named to the 1975 All-Pacific-8 Conference football team and received honorable mention by the AP and UPI All-America teams. Following the season, Burleson participated in the 1976 Japan Bowl and Hula Bowl.

As of 2016, he remains among the school's all-time leader in tackles (records kept since 1967), holds the season record for interception return yardage at 149 set in 1975, career record for interceptions returned for touchdowns, and holds the longest interception return at 93 yards which was set in the 1975 Apple Cup.

Professional career
Burleson played for the Calgary Stampeders from 1976 to 1981 and was a 1979 CFL All-Star. In 1983, he was a member of the Los Angeles Express.

Coaching
Burleson was a coach of the West Seattle Warhawks football team.

See also
 Washington Huskies football statistical leaders

References

External links
 CFLapedia profile
 Just Sports Stats profile

1954 births
Living people
Players of Canadian football from San Francisco
American football defensive backs
Washington Huskies football players
Calgary Stampeders players
Los Angeles Express players
Players of American football from San Francisco